Willis Alexander Ritchie (14 July 1864 – 17 January 1931), also known as W.A.Ritchie, was an architect whose career began in Ohio and Kansas, but reached maturity in Seattle and Spokane, Washington.

Ritchie was born in Van Wert, Ohio, before moving to Lima, Ohio, with his family where he would later begin his own practice. He won numerous competitions for county courthouses and other public buildings in the early 1890s, was the first architect to achieve a statewide reputation in Washington.  Among his major commissions is the Jefferson County, Washington courthouse, in Port Townsend, completed in 1890.

A number of his works are listed on the National Register of Historic Places.

Works include (with attribution)
Cowley County National Bank Building, 820-822 Main St. Winfield, KS (Richie Brothers), NRHP-listed
Stockgrowers State Bank, 8th and Main Sts. Ashland, KS (Richie, W.A., Co.), NRHP-listed
Jefferson County Courthouse, Jefferson and Case Sts. Port Townsend, WA (Ritchie, W.A.), NRHP-listed
Old Capitol Building, 600 block Washington St. Olympia, WA (Ritchie, Willis), NRHP-listed 
Ridenbaugh Hall, University of Idaho campus Moscow, ID (Ritchie, W.A.), NRHP-listed
Spokane County Courthouse, W. 1116 Broadway Spokane, WA (Ritchie, W.A.), NRHP-listed
One or more works in Ninth Avenue Historic District, roughly bounded by 7th Ave., Monroe St., 12th Ave. and the Burlington Northern RR tracks Spokane, WA (Ritchie, Willis), NRHP-listed

References

 Ochsner, Jeffrey Karl, Distant Corner: Seattle Architects and the Legacy of H.H. Richardson, University of Washington Press, Seattle and London 2003, pages 252–279,
 Ochsner, Jeffrey Karl, "Willis A. Ritchie." in Shaping Seattle Architecture: A Historical Guide to the Architects (Jeffrey Karl Ochsner, ed.), University of Washington Press, Seattle and London 1994, pages 40–45, 305–306, 

1864 births
1931 deaths
Architects from Seattle
Artists from Spokane, Washington